Richard Emmet Faust (July 27, 1903 – April 15, 1955) was an American football player.

An Ohio native, Faust attended Steele High School and Otterbein College.

He also played professional football in the National Football League (NFL) as a tackle, guard, and end for the Dayton Triangles. He appeared in 14 NFL games, 10 as a starter, over the course of the 1924, 1928, and 1929 seasons.

After retiring from football, he worked as a foreman at the Frigidaire plant in Moraine, Ohio. He lived in Dayton, Ohio, for approximately the last 40 years of his life. He died in an automobile accident in 1955 at age 51.

References

1955 deaths
Dayton Triangles players
Players of American football from Ohio
1903 births